Saskia Hippe (born 16 January 1991) is a German volleyball player. She is a member of the Germany women's national volleyball team. At club level, she plays in Hellenic Volley League for Greek powerhouse Olympiacos Piraeus.

Sporting achievements

National Team
 2007  Women's European U18 Championship
 2011  Women's European Volleyball Championship (Serbia / Italy)
 2013  Women's European Volleyball League (Varna, Bulgaria)
 2013  Women's European Volleyball Championship (Germany / Switzerland)

Clubs

International competitions
 2010  CEV Women's Challenge Cup, with Dresdner SC
 2017  CEV Women's Challenge Cup, with Olympiacos Piraeus
 2018  CEV Women's Challenge Cup, with Olympiacos Piraeus

National championships
 2012/2013  Czech Championship, with VK Prostějov
 2016/2017  Hellenic Championship, with Olympiacos Piraeus
 2017/2018  Hellenic Championship, with Olympiacos Piraeus
 2018/2019  Hellenic Championship, with Olympiacos Piraeus
 2019/2020  Hellenic Championship, with Olympiacos Piraeus

National trophies
 2009/2010  German Cup, with Dresdner SC
 2012/2013  Czech Cup, with VK Prostějov
 2016/2017  Hellenic Cup, with Olympiacos Piraeus
 2017/2018  Hellenic Cup, with Olympiacos Piraeus
 2018/2019  Hellenic Cup, with Olympiacos Piraeus

Individuals
 2010 CEV Women's Challenge Cup Final four M.V.P., with Dresdner SC
 2015/2016 Top scorer in German Championship - 511 points, with SC Podsdam
 2015/2016 Second best Opposite in German Championship, with SC Podsdam
 2017 Challenge Cup Top scorer (171 points), with Olympiacos Piraeus
 2017 Challenge Cup Best attacker (145 points), with Olympiacos Piraeus
 2017 Challenge Cup Best server (17 aces), with Olympiacos Piraeus
 2018 Hellenic Cup Final four M.V.P., with Olympiacos Piraeus
 2017/2018 Hellenic Championship M.V.P., with Olympiacos Piraeus
 2018 Challenge Cup Top scorer (207 points), with Olympiacos Piraeus
 2018 Challenge Cup Best attacker (173 points), with Olympiacos Piraeus
 2018 Challenge Cup Best server (24 aces), with Olympiacos Piraeus

References

External links
 Hippe's brief biography 
 Profile at women.volleybox.net
 2016: Hippe at Olympiacos (previous clubs - career) at Olympiacos official website 
 Hippe: Top scorer in German championship 
 Hippe 2018 Hellenic Cup Winner with Olympiacos at Olympiacos official website 
 Hippe 2018 Hellenic Champion, with Olympiacos at Olympiacos official website 
 Olympiacos Women's Volleyball team at Olympiacos official website
 

1991 births
Living people
German women's volleyball players
Olympiacos Women's Volleyball players
European Games competitors for Germany
Volleyball players at the 2015 European Games
Volleyball players from Berlin
German expatriates in Greece
21st-century German women